Robert Townsend may refer to:

Robert Townsend (spy) (1753–1838), American spy
Robert Townsend (captain) (1819–1866), United States Navy
Robert Townsend (author) (1920–1998), American author, CEO of Avis Rent a Car
Ed Townsend (swimmer) (Robert Edward Townsend Jr., born 1943), American swimmer
Rob Townsend (born 1947), English rock drummer
Robert M. Townsend (born 1948), professor of economics at MIT
Robert Townsend (actor) (born 1957), American actor and filmmaker

See also
Robert Townshend (disambiguation)